This is a list of submissions to the 46th Academy Awards for Best Foreign Language Film. The Academy Award for Best Foreign Language Film was created in 1956 by the Academy of Motion Picture Arts and Sciences to honour non-English-speaking films produced outside the United States. The award is handed out annually, and is accepted by the winning film's director, although it is considered an award for the submitting country as a whole. Countries are invited by the Academy to submit their best films for competition according to strict rules, with only one film being accepted from each country.

For the 46th Academy Awards, twenty films were submitted in the category Academy Award for Best Foreign Language Film. East Germany and Finland made their debuts in the competition. The bolded titles were the five nominated films, which came from France, West Germany, Israel, the Netherlands and Switzerland. France won the Oscar for the second year in a row for Day for Night.

Submissions

Notes

  Scenes from a Marriage sparked controversy when its ineligibility for the Academy Award for Best Foreign Language Film was questioned. The supposed reason was that it aired on television before it played in cinemas, but at the time that did not necessarily render a film ineligible. In this case, it was because the TV broadcast occurred the year before its theatrical debut in 1974. The film's ineligibility prompted 24 filmmakers, including Frank Capra and Federico Fellini, to write an open letter demanding the rules for eligibility be revised.

References

Sources
 Margaret Herrick Library, Academy of Motion Picture Arts and Sciences

46